Rahneshk may refer to:
 Rahnishk
 Rahnich